Ahtna or Ahtena (from  "Copper River") is the Na-Dené language of the Ahtna ethnic group of the Copper River area of Alaska. The language is also known as Copper River or Mednovskiy.

The Ahtna language consists of four different dialects: Upper, Central, Lower, and Western. Three of the four are still spoken today. Ahtna is closely related to Dena'ina.

The similar name Atnah occurs in the journals of Simon Fraser and other early European diarists in what is now British Columbia as a reference to the Tsilhqot'in people, another Northern Athapaskan group.

Classification 
Eyak-Athabaskan, Athabaskan, Northern Athabaskan.

History 
Ahtna is one of the eleven Athabaskan languages native to Alaska. The Ahtna language comes from the proto-Athabaskan language possibly evolving 5,000 to 10,000 years ago when humans migrated from Eurasia to The New World over the Bering Sea floor (Beringia) when it was dried up and exposed creating a natural land bridge. Many indigenous Native American languages are to have derived from this proto-Athabaskan language, Navajo is one language derived from this early language and consequently Ahtna and Navajo have many similarities. The Ahtna Language has changed very much and very often, it is still changing today. Within the past century more than one hundred words have made their way into the Ahtna vocabulary mostly due to Euro-American influences. Contact with Russians influenced the Ahtna language with many Russian loanwords being introduced. With contact from English speakers, especially recently, English words have also been introduced. Some words are also borrowed from the Alaskan Tlingit and Alutiiq native people.

Geographic distribution 
The Ahtna region consists of the Copper River Basin and the Wrangell Mountains. The Ahtna Region is bordered by the Nutzotin river in the Northeast and the Alaska Range in the North. The Talkeetna Mountains are to the Chugach Mountains are to the South. The Upper Ahtna live on the upper portion of the Copper River, The Middle or Central Ahtna live slightly down river from there, The Lower Ahtna live near the mouth of the Copper River, which opens into the Gulf of Alaska, and the Western Ahtna live to the West of the River.

The Ahtna people live on and near traditional villages. There are eight villages within the Ahtna Region: Cantwell, Chistochina, Chitina, Copper Center, Gakona, Gulkana, Mentasta and Tazlina. They are all recognized federally.

Use and revitalization efforts 
There are 15 elderly speakers out of a population of 500, and the language is facing extinction.

The subsistence and fishing-rights activist Katie John (1915–2013) of Mentasta helped develop an Ahtna alphabet in the 1970s and recorded a pronunciation guide of the Mentasta dialect.

In 2012 a facing-bilingual collection of poetry in Ahtna and English, The Indian Prophet, was published by poet John Smelcer.

In a revitalization program, the Ya Ne Dah Ah School in Sutton, Alaska teaches the Ahtna language as a part of its curriculum.

As of 2010, a digital archiving project of Ahtna was underway.

Dialects and bands 
There are four main dialect divisions and eight bands (tribal unions):

 Lower Ahtna (endonym )
 Chitina/Taral Band
 Tonsina/Klutina Band
 Central Ahtna or Middle Ahtna (endonym )
 Gulkona/Gakona Band
 Western Ahtna (own name Tsaay Hwt'aene)
 Tyone/Mendeltna Band
 Cantwell/Denali Band
 Upper Ahtna (endonym )
 Sanford River/Chistochina Band 
 Slana/Batzulnetas Band
 Mentasta Band

Vocabulary comparison 
The comparison of some animal names in the three Athabaskan languages:

Phonology 
Athabaskan languages are primarily prefixing. Many prefixes are presented together. There is limited suffixation and often one word has as much meaning as an English language sentence. Verbs are very complex therefore creating many different meanings or analysis of verbs. Some verbs include syntactic principles in addition to and/or replacement of morphological principles when constructing a word.

Consonants  
The consonants in Kari's IPA phonology and practical orthography are shown in the following table.

Vowels  
The vowels in Kari's practical orthography and phonology are as follows.

There is some variation in pronunciation of words according to dialect.

Grammar

Possessives 
Possession is indicated by prefixes such as  "my",  or  "his/her",  "our"; as in  "my mother",  (or ) "his/her mother",  "our mother".

Verb themes 
Verbs are primarily prefixing. There are often six or more prefixes before the stem and then one or more suffixes. (1a) displays a surface form in Ahtna spelling while (1b) is the verb theme. Three prefixes are present that have to be listed with the stem to make up the form. Anything adjacent in a verb theme can be separated by morphemes in the forms surface. Verb themes display what elements should be listed in a dictionary for a speaker to be able to reconstruct the verb. '#' displays an important word-internal boundary known as a disjunct boundary. '+' indicates a morpheme boundary.

In the Ahtna language the verb typically goes after the noun.

Noun modification 
In the Ahtna language, modifiers usually go after the noun they modify. Examples of this include the name of the deity or trickster figure , where  is the noun "raven" and  the adjective "little, small" or in the term   "permafrost", a combination of  "land, ground" and  "frozen". This word order is also seen in place names such as  "Denali/Mount McKinley", literally "Biggest Mountain", and  "Lake Susitna", literally "Big Lake".

References

External links
 Ahtna basic lexicon at the Global Lexicostatistical Database
Ahtna Language, Mentasta Dialect
Ahtna language, Chistochina Dialect
An Ahtna language story
Endangered Language Project: Ahtna
Ahtna Noun Dictionary and Pronunciation Guide (2nd Edition)

Ahtna
Critically endangered languages
Northern Athabaskan languages
Indigenous languages of Alaska
Indigenous languages of the North American Subarctic
Endangered Dené–Yeniseian languages
Native American language revitalization
Official languages of Alaska